Cameo lighting in film is a spotlight that accentuates a single person and maybe a few props in a scene. It creates an 'angelic' shot, such as one where God is shining down and a light shines down onto this person.

Cameo lighting derives its name from the art form in which a light relief figure is set against a darker background.  It is often achieved by using barn-doored spotlights. It helps focus on the subject and not its environment. A problem with cameo lighting is that it can lead to color distortion and noise in the darkest areas.

References

Film and video terminology